Anis Don Demina (born Anis Dhahir 25 April 1993) is a Swedish singer, songwriter, musician and DJ.

Early life 

His Kurdish father, an auto mechanic, fled from the Gulf War to Russia where he met Anis's Belarusian mother, a pianist and music historian. The couple went on their honeymoon to  Sweden and decided to stay in Sundsvall, where Anis was born. When he was one year old, they moved to Jordbro, Stockholm, where he grew up with his parents, an older brother and an older sister.

Career

2017: Record deal 

Demina has performed at clubs such as Movida in Dubai and Cirque Le Soir in London. In 2017, he signed a record deal with Warner Music and released his first single, "On My Mind", which received 1.5 million streams in its first month. In the summer of 2017, Demina went viral on YouTube after uploading a video criticizing Swedish YouTuber and musician Joakim Lundell.

2018–present: Melodifestivalen and new singles 

Demina participated in Melodifestivalen 2018, where he played the saxophone during Samir & Viktor's performance of their song "Shuffla", which finished fourth in the finale. He performed at the Peace & Love festival in 2018. In May 2018, his song "Wasted" (featuring Mad Kings) entered the Sverigetopplistan singles chart at number 33. He was also featured in "Put Your Hands Up för Sverige", a single by Samir & Viktor in support of the Swedish national football team for the 2018 FIFA World Cup. He participated in Melodifestivalen 2019, with the song "Mina bränder" along with singer Zeana. On 4 February 2019, the song entered at number 23 on the Spotify Top 200 chart in Sweden. He participated in the competition again in Melodifestivalen 2020 with the song "Vem e som oss", this time as a solo artist. Demina competed in the finale, which was held on 7 March 2020. He reached fifth place in the finale, scoring 82 points. On 20 March 2020, Demina release the single "1+1", featuring Råsa. The single debuted and peaked at number 96 on the Swedish Singles Chart. On 8 May 2020, Demina released the single "Naken", featuring Swedish musician Timbuktu. It peaked at number 39 on the Swedish Singles Chart.

Discography

Extended plays

Singles

As lead artist

As featured artist

Notes

Citations

External links 

 
 

1993 births
21st-century Swedish singers
21st-century Swedish male singers
Living people
People from Sundsvall
Swedish people of Iraqi descent
Swedish people of Belarusian descent
Warner Music Sweden artists
Melodifestivalen contestants of 2020
Melodifestivalen contestants of 2019
Melodifestivalen contestants of 2018